Roti gambang or ganjel rel is an Indonesian rectangular-shaped brown bread with sesame seeds, flavoured with cinnamon and palm sugar.

Roti gambang is names as a Betawi traditional bread from Jakarta. Yet, it is also recognised as Javanese traditional bread as roti ganjel rel. This bread is typical Javanese bread and usually served during Dugderan, Ramadan, Eid ul-Fitr, and other Javanese occasion. Roti gambang originates from Jakarta and Semarang, Central Java.

This bread was listed on the 50 best breads in the world by CNN 2019.

Etymology
The term gambang is a Betawi term refer to gambang, a xylophone-like wooden or metal bars used as musical instrument as commonly found in Betawi gambang kromong orchestra, as well as in gamelan orchestra. This naming was because the similarity of its shape with gambang bars. Its Javanese name however, roti ganjel rel (lit. "rail support bread") refer to wooden railroad tie, again to describe its similarity to rail tie that secured the rail upon the ballast.

See also
 Cuisine of Indonesia
 Javanese cuisine
 List of Indonesian dishes
 List of Indonesian snacks
Other Indonesian breads:
 Roti buaya
 Roti canai
 Roti jala
 Roti naan
 Roti tisu

References

Indonesian breads
Javanese cuisine
Betawi cuisine